(December 2, 1976) is the lead vocalist, main songwriter and rhythm guitarist of the Japanese rock band Asian Kung-Fu Generation. Masafumi met fellow band members Kensuke Kita and Takahiro Yamada while attending a music club of Kanto Gakuin University. The three formed Asian Kung-Fu Generation in 1996, with drummer Kiyoshi Ijichi joining the band shortly after. As the main songwriter of the band, Gotoh is credited with writing a majority of their lyrics, but has a strong tendency to share songwriting duties equally among his bandmates. His vocal style most often alternates between soft, melodic singing, and harder, harsher, yelling. Masafumi has a degree in economics and his favourite artists include Weezer, Number Girl, Oasis, Teenage Fanclub, and Beck. He produces records for other artists such as Chatmonchy, Dr. Downer and The Chef Cooks Me. He was also one of the founding members of the band .

In 2010, Gotoh launched his own music label, only in dreams. In 2012, he started a solo project under the name Gotch, and released the single "'lost". In 2014, he released his debut solo album, Can't Be Forever Young and released live album called, Live in Tokyo. In 2016, he released his second solo album, Good New Times, with most songs using English lyrics.

Discography

Asian Kung-Fu Generation

Solo

Studio albums

Live albums

Extended plays

Singles

Other 
 New Order – Waiting for the Sirens' Call (2005) lyrics on "Krafty (Japanese Version)"
 Dr. Downer – Rising (2011) music director
 Special Others – Special Others (2011) collaboration on "Dance in Tsurumi"
 Feeder – Generation Freakshow Japanese edition (2012) vocals on "Idaho"
 Chatmonchy – "Kirakira Hikare" (2012) producer; vocals on "Karisomethod"
 Chatmonchy – Henshin (2012) producer on "Yes or No or Love" and "Kirakira Hikare"
 Dr. Downer – Gensō no Maboroshi (2013) producer
 The Chef Cooks Me – Kaitentai (2013) producer, vocals on "Kanjōsen wa Bokura o Nosete"
 ART-SCHOOL – YOU (2014) producer
 Ovall - "Nadaraka Yoru" (2018) vocals
 Co.Ruri Mito - MeMe (2019) music producer
 Nahavand – Vandalism (2019) producer, vocals on "Hold On"
 The Chef Cooks Me – "Kakato de Ai o Uchinarase" (2019) vocals
 SOFTTOUCH – "Jiyū Ishi" (2019) producer
 Aiha Higurashi – "Je t'aime" (2019) producer
 Aiha Higurashi – "Shining all over" (2019) vocal
 Manami Konishi – Cure (2020) producer and backing vocals on "Endless Summer", producer on "Ain't Nobody Know"
 FIRE EX. – "The Light" (2020) vocal
 Moment Joon – "Doukutsu" (2020) vocal
 The Rentals – "Goodbye, Steve" (2020) vocal
 SOCCER*SCHOOL - "last summer bleeze" (2021) mixing
 Moment Joon – "Distance" (2021) vocal
 Hironoi Momoi – "Fog" (2021) vocal, lyrics
 Lil Boom – "The End of the World" (2021) vocal
 Nahavand – "World Trigger"' (2022) recording
 Yuragi – For you, Adroit it but soft : Remixes & Rarities (2022) mastering
 The Tiva – On This Planet (2022) mastering
 Mofution Vibration – "Oboroge" (2022) mixing, mastering
 Dhira Bongs – A Tiny Bit of Gold in The Dark Ocean (2022) vocal on "Make Me Fallin In Love Again"
 Link – Tsuki no Hana EP (2023) producer, recording, mixing

References

External links 
 
 Discography at RateYourMusic
 Only in Dreams label
 Asian Kung-Fu Generation

1976 births
Living people
Japanese rock guitarists
Japanese male rock singers
Japanese songwriters
Asian Kung-Fu Generation members
Kanto Gakuin University alumni
20th-century Japanese guitarists
21st-century Japanese guitarists
Musicians from Shizuoka Prefecture